Écône is an area in the municipality of Riddes, district of Martigny, in the canton of Valais, Switzerland. It is the location of the International Seminary of Saint Pius X.

External links
Map

Villages in Valais